The Sahelian kingdoms were a series of centralized kingdoms or empires that were centered on the Sahel, the area of grasslands south of the Sahara, from the 8th century to the 19th. The wealth of the states came from controlling the trade routes across the desert.  Their power came from having large pack animals like camels and horses that were fast enough to keep a large empire under central control and were also useful in such kind of battle. All of these empires were also quite decentralized with member cities having a great deal of autonomy.

The Sahel states were limited from expanding south into the forest zone of the Bono and Yoruba as mounted warriors were all but useless in the forests and the horses and camels could not survive the diseases of the region.

Economy

There were integrated kingdoms and empires, with substantial cities and significant towns; and less organised territories with large scattered populations. People practised agriculture, stock-rearing, hunting, fishing, and crafts (metalworking, textiles, ceramics). They navigated along rivers and across lakes, traded over short and long distances, and used their own currencies.

History of Sahel kingdoms

The first major state to rise in this region was the Ghana Empire. Established in c. the 8th century, it was centered in what is today Senegal and Mauritania, it was the first to benefit from the introduction of pack animals by Wolof traders.  Ghana dominated the region between about 750 and 1078.  Smaller states in the region at this time included Takrur to the west, the Malinke kingdom of Mali to the south, and the Songhai centred on Gao to the east.
When Ghana collapsed in the face of invasion from the Almoravids, a series of brief kingdoms followed, notably that of the Sosso; after 1235, the Mali Empire rose to dominate the region, which traded with Bono state at the far south.  Located on the Niger River to the west of Ghana in what is today Niger and Mali, it reached its peak in the 1350s, but had lost control of a number of vassal states by 1400.
The most powerful of these states was the Songhai Empire, which expanded rapidly beginning with king Sonni Ali in the 1460s. By 1500, it had risen to stretch from Cameroon to the Maghreb, the largest state in African history.  Its territory diminished to cover only the Dendi province in 1591 as a result of the invasion by the Saadi Dynasty of Morocco. The empire collapsed in 1901 when the French deposed the last askia.
Far to the east, on Lake Chad, the state of Kanem-Bornu, founded as Kanem in the 9th century, now rose to greater preeminence in the central Sahel region. To their west, the loosely united Hausa city-states became dominant.  These two states coexisted uneasily, but were quite stable.
In 1810, the Sokoto Caliphate rose and conquered the Hausa, creating a more centralized state.  It and Kanem-Bornu would continue to exist.

Maps

References

 
History of Africa